Strzegomka is a river of Poland, a tributary of the Bystrzyca in Samotwór.  Before 1945 the river was known as the Striegau.

Rivers of Poland
Rivers of Lower Silesian Voivodeship